Korenovsky (masculine), Korenovskaya (feminine), or Korenovskoye (neuter) may refer to:
Korenovsky District, a district of Krasnodar Krai, Russia
Korenovskoye Urban Settlement, a municipal formation which the Town of Korenovsk in Korenovsky District of Krasnodar Krai is incorporated as
Korenovskoye, name of the town of Korenovsk in Krasnodar Krai until the end of the 19th century
Korenovskaya, name of the town of Korenovsk in Krasnodar Krai until 1961